People bearing the name Huzaifah or Hudhaifah
 Huzaifah Aziz Singaporan footballer
 Abu Huzaifa al-Kanadi is also known as Shehroze Chaudhry, a sef-described member of Islamic state
 Muhammad ibn Abi Hudhayfa became governor of Egypt in 656
 Abu Hudhaifah ibn al-Mughirah a sahaba of Muhammad
 Abdullah ibn Hudhafah as-Sahmi a companion of Muhammad
 Khunais ibn Hudhaifa a companion of Muhammad
 Hudhayfah ibn al-Yaman a companion of Muhammad